Caldwell Community College and Technical Institute (CCC&TI) is a public community college in Hudson, North Carolina. It serves residents of Caldwell and Watauga counties. CCC&TI is part of the North Carolina Community College System.

CCC&TI offers two full-service campuses, one in Hudson, North Carolina, and another in Boone. Additional college facilities include: the Transportation and Public Services Center in Hudson, the J.E. Broyhill Civic Center in Lenoir and the Broyhill House in Lenoir.

CCC&TI is accredited by the Commission on Colleges of the Southern Association of Colleges and Schools to award associate degrees.

History
In 1964, the college first opened its doors as Caldwell Technical Institute with the employment of Dr. H. Edwin Beam as its first president. Health occupations courses were offered in 1965, with the college's first facilities occupied in 1967. Three years later, the institution's name was changed to Caldwell Community College and Technical Institute as the college transfer program was implemented.

CCC&TI's second president, Dr. Eric B. McKeithan, was appointed in 1984. Dr. Kenneth A. Boham took the reins as president in 1995 and retired as president in 2016. Caldwell County native Dr. Mark Poarch was named president in 2016, becoming the institution's fourth president.

The Appalachian Center at Caldwell is located on the Hudson Campus of CCC&TI. Also on campus is Caldwell Early College High School, where students can get their high school diploma and an associate degree at the same time. The campus also houses the Caldwell Applied Sciences Academy, formerly known as the Caldwell Career Center Middle College.

CCC&TI offers over 100 curriculum programs and a variety of continuing education options.

Arts
From 1984 to 1988, CCC&TI housed and sponsored the Unifour Jazz Ensemble, and were the 1987 Community College Jazz Ensemble national champions. In 1990, UJE was named Community Jazz Ensemble of the 1980s by the International Association for Jazz Education, and in 2013, its director Tom Smith was inducted into the Down Beat Jazz Education Hall of Fame.

Athletics
The college competes in National Junior College Athletic Association (NJCAA) sports (men's and women's basketball, baseball and softball), using the mascot and nickname "Cobras".

References

External links
Official website

Two-year colleges in the United States
Universities and colleges accredited by the Southern Association of Colleges and Schools
Vocational education in the United States
Education in Caldwell County, North Carolina
North Carolina Community College System colleges
Educational institutions established in 1964
Education in Watauga County, North Carolina
Buildings and structures in Caldwell County, North Carolina
Buildings and structures in Watauga County, North Carolina
1964 establishments in North Carolina
NJCAA athletics